Umberto "Albert" Anastasia (born Anastasio ; September 26, 1902 – October 25, 1957) was an Italian-American mobster, hitman, and crime boss. One of the founders of the modern American Mafia, and a co-founder and later boss of the Murder, Inc. organization, Anastasia eventually rose to the position of boss in what became the modern Gambino crime family. He also controlled New York City's waterfront for most of his criminal career, including the dockworker unions. Anastasia was murdered on October 25, 1957, on the orders of Vito Genovese and Carlo Gambino; Gambino subsequently became boss of the family.

Anastasia was one of the most ruthless and feared organized crime figures in American history; his reputation earned him the nicknames "The Earthquake", "The One-Man Army", "Mad Hatter" and "Lord High Executioner".

Early life
Anastasia was born Umberto Anastasio on September 26, 1902, in Parghelia, Calabria, Italy, to Bartolomeo Anastasio and Marianna Polistena. Anastasia's father was a railway worker who died after World War I, leaving behind nine children. Anastasia had seven brothers: Raffaele; Frank; Anthony; Joseph; Gerardo; Luigi (who moved to Australia) and Salvatore Anastasio; and a sister, Maria.

In 1919, Anastasia, with his brothers Joseph, Anthony, and Gerardo, illegally entered the United States after they deserted a freighter they were working aboard in New York City. They soon started working as longshoremen on the Brooklyn waterfront.

On March 17, 1921, Anastasia was convicted of murdering longshoreman George Turino as the result of a quarrel. He was sentenced to death and sent to Sing Sing State Prison in Ossining, New York, to await execution. Due to a legal technicality, Anastasia won a retrial in 1922; four of the original prosecution witnesses had since disappeared, and Anastasia was released from custody. During that time, he changed his surname from "Anastasio" to "Anastasia".

On June 6, 1923, Anastasia was convicted of illegal possession of a firearm and sentenced to two years in prison. In 1937, he married Elsa Bargnesi and they had two sons, Umberto and Richard; and two daughters, Joyana and Gloriana.

Rise to power
By the late 1920s, Anastasia had become a top leader of the International Longshoremen's Association (ILA), controlling six local chapters of the labor union in Brooklyn. Anastasia allied himself with Giuseppe "Joe the Boss" Masseria, a powerful mafia leader in Brooklyn. He soon became close associates with future Cosa Nostra bosses Joe Adonis, Charles "Lucky" Luciano, Vito Genovese, and Frank Costello.

In 1928, Anastasia was charged with a murder in Brooklyn, but the witnesses either disappeared or refused to testify in court.

Castellammarese War
In early 1931, the Castellammarese War broke out between Joe Masseria and Salvatore Maranzano. In a secret deal with Maranzano, Luciano agreed to engineer the death of his boss, Masseria, in return for receiving Masseria's rackets and becoming Maranzano's second-in-command. On April 15, 1931, Luciano had lured Masseria to a meeting where he was murdered at a restaurant called Nuova Villa Tammaro on Coney Island. While they played cards, Luciano allegedly excused himself to the bathroom, with the gunmen reportedly being Anastasia, Vito Genovese, Joe Adonis, and Benjamin "Bugsy" Siegel; Ciro "The Artichoke King" Terranova drove the getaway car, but legend has it that he was too shaken up to drive away and had to be shoved out of the driver's seat by Siegel. Luciano took over Masseria's family, with Genovese as his underboss.

In September 1931, Luciano and Genovese planned the murder of Salvatore Maranzano. Luciano had received word that Maranzano was planning to kill him and Genovese, and prepared a hit team to kill Maranzano first. On September 10, 1931, when Maranzano summoned Luciano, Genovese, and Frank Costello to a meeting at his office, they knew Maranzano would kill them there. Instead, Luciano sent to Maranzano's office four Jewish gangsters whose faces were unknown to Maranzano's people. They had been secured with the aid of Lansky and Siegel. With the National Crime Syndicate already created by Luciano since 1929, after the death of Maranzano he also subsequently created The Commission to serve as the governing body for organized crime. The Syndicate was meant to serve as a deliberative body to solve disputes, carve up and distribute territories, and regulate lucrative illegal activities such as racketeering, gambling, and bootlegging (which came to a close with the repeal of Prohibition in 1933).

In 1932, Anastasia was indicted on charges of murdering another man with an ice pick, but the case was dropped due to lack of witnesses. The following year, he was charged with killing a man who worked in a laundry; again, there were no witnesses willing to testify.

Murder, Inc.
To reward Anastasia's loyalty, Luciano placed him and Louis "Lepke" Buchalter, the leading labor racketeer in the country, in control of the Syndicate's enforcement arm, Murder, Inc. The troop, also known as "The Brownsville Boys", was a group of Jewish and Italian contract killers that operated out of the back room of Midnight Rose's, a candy store owned by mobster Louis Capone in the Brownsville neighborhood of Brooklyn. During its ten years of operation, it is estimated that Murder Inc. committed thousands of murders, many of which were never solved. For his leadership in Murder, Inc., Anastasia was nicknamed the "Mad Hatter" and the "Lord High Executioner".

The Commission's first test came in 1935, when it ordered Dutch Schultz to drop his plans to murder Special Prosecutor Thomas E. Dewey. Luciano argued that a Dewey assassination would precipitate a massive law enforcement crackdown. An enraged Schultz said he would kill Dewey anyway and walked out of the meeting. Anastasia approached Luciano with information that Schultz had asked him to stake out Dewey's apartment building on Fifth Avenue. Upon hearing the news, the Commission held a discreet meeting to discuss the matter. After six hours of deliberations the Commission ordered Buchalter to eliminate Schultz. On October 23, 1935, before he could kill Dewey, Schultz was shot in a tavern in Newark, New Jersey, and succumbed to his injuries the following day.

On June 7, 1936, following a prosecution by Dewey's office masterminded by Eunice Carter, Luciano was convicted on 62 counts of forced prostitution. On July 18, 1936, he received a 30 to 50-year sentence in state prison.
 Genovese became acting boss, but he fled to Italy in 1937 after being indicted on a 1934 murder. Costello now became acting boss of the Luciano crime family.

In May 1939, Anastasia allegedly ordered the murder of Morris Diamond, a Teamsters Union official in Brooklyn who had opposed Buchalter's attempts to maintain control of the Garment District in Manhattan. In the summer of 1939, he allegedly organized the murder of Peter Panto, an ILA activist who had been leading a movement for democratic reforms in the union's local chapters, and refused to be intimidated by ILA officials. On July 14, 1939, Panto disappeared; his body was later recovered on a farm in New Jersey.

In 1941, Abe Reles, a gang leader from Brownsville, Brooklyn who had been supplying Anastasia and Murder, Inc. with hitmen for the previous decade, was arrested by law enforcement, effectively ending Murder, Inc. Reles decided to testify for the government to 
save himself from the death penalty, leading to the conviction of seven members of Murder Inc. Reles also had information that could implicate Anastasia in the Diamond and Panto murders. Fearful of prosecution, Anastasia offered a $100,000 reward for Reles's murder. On November 12, 1941, Reles was found dead on a restaurant roof outside the Half Moon Hotel in Coney Island. Reles was being guarded in a sixth-floor room during an ongoing trial. In 1951, a grand jury ruled that Reles accidentally died while climbing down to the fifth floor using sheets tied to a heating radiator. However, many officials still suspected that Reles had been murdered.

In the spring of 1942, Anastasia allegedly ordered the murder of an associate, Anthony Romeo, who had been arrested and questioned in the Panto killing. At the end of June, Romeo's body was discovered near Guyencourt, Delaware; he had been beaten and shot a number of times.

World War II
During World War II, Anastasia reportedly conceived the plan to win a pardon for the imprisoned Luciano by helping the war effort. With the United States needing allies in Sicily to advance the invasion of Italy, and the desire of the U.S. Navy to dedicate its resources to the war, Anastasia orchestrated a deal to obtain lighter treatment and eventual parole for Luciano, in exchange for the Mafia's protection of the waterfront and Luciano's assistance with his associates in Sicily.

In 1942, Anastasia joined the U.S. Army, possibly motivated by a desire to escape the criminal investigations that were dismantling Murder, Inc. Attaining the rank of technical sergeant, he trained soldiers to be longshoremen at Fort Indiantown Gap in Pennsylvania. In 1943, as a reward for his military service, he received U.S. citizenship. The following year, Anastasia was honorably discharged and moved his family to a ranch house on Bluff Road in Fort Lee, New Jersey.

In 1945, U.S. military authorities in Sicily returned Genovese to the U.S. to be tried for the murder of Ferdinand Boccia in 1934. However, after the death of the main prosecution witness, all charges were dropped against Genovese. In 1946, New York Governor Thomas E. Dewey commuted Luciano's sentence, and the federal government immediately deported him to Italy.

In 1948, Anastasia bought a dressmaking factory in Hazleton, Pennsylvania and left his waterfront activities in the control of his brother Anthony.

Boss
In 1951, the U.S. Senate summoned Anastasia to answer questions about organized crime at the Kefauver Hearings. Anastasia refused to answer any questions.

Despite being a mob power in his own right, Anastasia was nominally the underboss of the Mangano crime family, under boss Vincent Mangano. During his 20-year rule, Mangano had resented Anastasia's close ties to Luciano and Costello, particularly the fact that they had obtained Anastasia's services without first seeking Mangano's permission. This and other business disputes led to heated, almost physical fights between the two mobsters. On April 19, 1951, Mangano went missing and his body was never found. The same day, the body of Vincent's brother Philip was discovered in Jamaica Bay. No one was ever arrested in the Mangano murders, but it was widely assumed that Anastasia had them killed.

After the deaths of the Manganos, Anastasia, who had been serving as acting boss of their family, met with the Commission, claiming that the brothers wanted to kill him, yet did not admit to killing them. With Costello's prodding, the Commission confirmed Anastasia's ascension as boss of the renamed Anastasia family; Costello wanted Anastasia as an ally against the ambitious and resentful Genovese. Anastasia was also supported by Joseph Bonanno, who simply wanted to avoid a gang war.

In March 1952, Anastasia allegedly ordered the murder of Arnold Schuster, a New York man who successfully identified fugitive bank robber Willie Sutton, resulting in Sutton's arrest. When Anastasia saw Schuster being interviewed on television, he allegedly said: "I can't stand squealers! Hit that guy!" On March 8, 1952, a gunman shot Schuster to death on a street in Borough Park, Brooklyn.  In 1963, government witness Joseph Valachi accused Anastasia of ordering the murder, but many people in law enforcement were skeptical of it. No one was ever arrested in the Schuster murder.

On December 9, 1952, the federal government filed suit to denaturalize Anastasia and deport him because he lied on his citizenship application.

Conspiracy
To take control of the Luciano family, Genovese needed to kill Costello. Unable to do so without also eliminating Anastasia, Genovese looked for allies. He used Anastasia's brutal behavior against him in an effort to win supporters, portraying Anastasia as an unstable killer who threatened to bring law enforcement pressure on the Cosa Nostra. In addition, Genovese pointed out that Anastasia had been selling memberships to his crime family for $50,000, a clear violation of Commission rules that infuriated many high-level mobsters. According to Valachi, Anastasia had been losing large amounts of money betting on horse races, making him even more surly and unpredictable.

Over the next few years, Genovese secretly won the support of Anastasia caporegime Carlo Gambino, offering him the leadership of Anastasia's family in return for his cooperation.

On May 23, 1955, Anastasia pleaded guilty to tax evasion for underreporting his income during the late 1940s. On June 3, 1955, Anastasia was sentenced to one year in federal prison and a $20,000 fine. After his conviction, the federal government successfully petitioned to revoke Anastasia's citizenship so he could be deported. However, on September 19, 1955, a higher court overturned this ruling.

In early 1957, Genovese decided to move on Costello. On May 2, 1957, gunman Vincent Gigante shot and wounded Costello outside his apartment building. Although the wound was superficial, it persuaded Costello to relinquish power to Genovese and retire. Genovese then controlled what is now called the Genovese crime family. Bonanno later credited himself with arranging a sitdown, where he kept Anastasia from immediately taking Genovese to war in response.

On June 17 of that year, Frank Scalice, Anastasia's underboss and the man identified as directly responsible for selling Gambino memberships, was also assassinated. According to Valachi, Anastasia approved the hit, and the subsequent murder of Scalice's brother Joseph, after offering to forgive his threats to avenge Frank.

Assassination
On the morning of October 25, 1957, Anastasia entered the barber shop of the Park Sheraton Hotel, at 56th Street and 7th Avenue in Midtown Manhattan. Anastasia's driver parked the car in an underground garage and then took a walk outside, leaving him unprotected. As Anastasia relaxed in the barber's chair, two men with scarves covering their faces rushed in, shoved the barber out of the way, and fired at Anastasia. After the first volley of bullets, Anastasia reportedly lunged at his killers. However, the stunned Anastasia had actually attacked the gunmen's reflections in the wall mirror of the barber shop. The gunmen continued firing until Anastasia finally fell dead on the floor.

The Anastasia homicide generated a tremendous amount of public interest and sparked a high-profile police investigation. According to The New York Times journalist and Five Families author Selwyn Raab, "The vivid image of a helpless victim swathed in white towels was stamped in the public memory". However, no one was charged in the case. Speculation on who killed Anastasia has centered on Profaci crime family mobster Joe Gallo, the Patriarca crime family of Providence, Rhode Island, and certain drug dealers within the Gambino family. Initially, the NYPD concluded that Anastasia's homicide had been arranged by Genovese and Gambino and that it was carried out by a crew led by Gallo. At one point, Gallo boasted to an associate of his part in the hit, "You can just call the five of us the barbershop quintet". Elsewhere, Genovese had traditionally strong ties to Patriarca boss Raymond L. S. Patriarca.

Anastasia's funeral service was conducted at a Brooklyn funeral home; the Roman Catholic Diocese of Brooklyn had refused to sanction a church burial. Anastasia was interred in Green-Wood Cemetery in Greenwood Heights, Brooklyn, attended by a handful of friends and relatives. It is marked "Anastasio". In 1958, his family emigrated to Canada, and changed the name to "Anisio".

Aftermath
Gambino was expected to be proclaimed boss of Anastasia's family at the November 14, 1957, Apalachin Meeting, called by Genovese to discuss the future of Cosa Nostra in light of his takeover. When the meeting was raided by police, to the detriment of Genovese's reputation, Gambino's appointment was postponed to a later meeting in New York City. Under Gambino, Anthony Anastasio saw his power curtailed, and in frustration, he began passing information to the FBI shortly before his 1963 death.

Genovese enjoyed a short reign as family boss. In 1957, after the disastrous Apalachin Meeting, Luciano, Costello, and Gambino conspired to entrap Genovese with a narcotics conviction, bribing a drug dealer to testify he had personally worked with Genovese. On July 7, 1958, Genovese was indicted on narcotics trafficking charges. On April 17, 1959, he was sentenced to 15 years in state prison.

Anastasia lived in the 25-room, 6,529-square-foot, hilltop mansion located in Fort Lee, New Jersey from 1947, until his assassination. In 1958, less than a year after his death, comedian Buddy Hackett and his wife purchased the mansion, and after renovations, lived there through most of the 1960s. The mansion sold for $6.9 million in late December 2017.
The house was last sold in December 2018, for $3.6 million, and demolished in March 2019.
Actor and former heavyweight boxing contender Jack O'Halloran claims to be Anastasia's illegitimate son.

See also

List of unsolved murders

In popular culture
After the Anastasia assassination, the barber chairs at the Park Sheraton Hotel were repositioned to face away from the mirror. The Anastasia chair was later auctioned off for $7,000. In February 2012, the chair became an exhibit at the Mob Museum in Las Vegas.

Movies
The fictional character Johnny Friendly (played by Lee J. Cobb) in the classic 1954 American film On the Waterfront was partially based on Anastasia.
The 1959 film Inside the Mafia opens with the scene of Anastasia's assassination.
Anastasia's murder, as well as the 1957 Apalachin Meeting, were referenced in the 1999 film Analyze This, starring Robert De Niro and Billy Crystal.
Anastasia is portrayed by Fausto Tozzi in the 1972 film The Valachi Papers.
He is portrayed by Richard Conte in Italian movie of 1973 with Alberto Sordi: My Brother Anastasia.
He is portrayed by Gianni Russo in the 1975 film Lepke, starring Tony Curtis.
He is portrayed by Garry Pastore in the 2019 movies The Irishman and Mob Town.

Television
The TV series M*A*S*H makes a reference to Anastasia's death, anachronistically, as the Korean War had already been over for four years when Anastasia was killed.
Season 4, Episode 12 "Soldier of the Month", Hawkeye Pierce sarcastically refers to a sleeping soldier as "Albert Anastasia's doorman".
In the TV series The West Wing Season 4, Episode 11 "Holy Night", Jules Ziegler, the estranged father of White House Communications Director Toby Ziegler visits Toby at the White House. Following a query from the Justice Department, Toby asks his father, a former member of Murder, Inc. when Albert Anastasia was killed. Jules answers, "October 1957", and later tells his son, "You should know when Anastasia was killed". Toby, still angry at his father for having been involved in organized crime, retorts, "I know when Anastasia was killed!".
In an episode of The Sopranos, mob boss Junior Soprano tells his nephew Tony Soprano that he wishes problems were settled amicably like they were in the 1950s when it was peaceful. Tony replies he remembered seeing the picture of Anastasia "all amicably" in a pool of blood on the barbershop floor. "There were exceptions", Junior replied.
The Netflix series, "Dirty John" main character, John claims to have ancestry to Anastasia as reason for his brutal behavior.

Literature
In The Day of The Jackal, a 1973 novel by Frederick Forsyth, a detective considers Marco Vitellino, a fictitious bodyguard who was absent during Anastasia's assassination as one of several suspects who could be an assassin contracted to kill French President Charles de Gaulle. The bodyguard is ruled out because he doesn't fit the description of the assassin.
A fictional payback hit for Anastasia's murder is described in "Before the Play", the prologue of The Shining. In the book, the fictional Overlook Hotel was a popular meeting place and neutral ground for organized crime figures in the post-war era. The target was a powerful mobster who was guarded by two gunmen he had loaned from New York City. Three hit-men with shotguns took out the bodyguards. They then shot down the target in his room and then castrated his corpse as proof they had killed him.
Anastasia's murder is mentioned in the Harold Robbins book The Raiders (1995). In the book the hit is carried out by an obfuscated assassin known only by the pseudonym Malditesta (Italian for a greatly painful headache).
Mayra Montero's novel Son de Almendra (English title: Dancing to "Almendra") is based on Anastasia's murder.

Videogames
In Mafia II, Don Alberto Clemente is partially based on Anastasia, particularly his known violations of Mafia code by trying to "sell" made men. Clemente's death was based on a combination of Anastasia's assassination as well as the attempted murder of Adolf Hitler at the Wolf's Den.

Music
Rapper Rick Ross entitled his 2010 mixtape The Albert Anastasia EP.
Psychedelic Rock group, St John Green, references Albert on song “Shivers of Pleasure” on their self titled album.

References

External links

1902 births
1957 deaths
1957 murders in the United States
United States Army personnel of World War II
American crime bosses
American people convicted of tax crimes
American people convicted of murder
Bosses of the Gambino crime family
Burials at Green-Wood Cemetery
Criminals from Brooklyn
Deaths by firearm in Manhattan
Gambino crime family
Italian emigrants to the United States
Italian crime bosses
Italian gangsters
Male murder victims
Military personnel from New York City
Gangsters from New York City
Murder, Inc.
Murdered American gangsters of Italian descent
People from Brooklyn
People from the Province of Vibo Valentia
People murdered in New York City
Prohibition-era gangsters
United States Army non-commissioned officers
Unsolved murders in the United States
People of Calabrian descent